Mark Edmondson won the title, defeating Roscoe Tanner 6–3, 5–7, 6–4 in the final.

Seeds

  Roscoe Tanner (final)
  Johan Kriek (semifinals)
  Stan Smith (second round)
  Paul McNamee (semifinals)
  Bill Scanlon (second round)
  Buster Mottram (second round)
  Phil Dent (quarterfinals)
  Chris Lewis (first round)

Draw

Finals

Top half

Bottom half

External links
 Main draw

1981 Grand Prix (tennis)
1981 Bristol Open